A spiral staircase is a type of stairway characterized by its helical shape

Spiral Staircase may also refer to:

Books
 The Spiral Staircase: My Climb Out Of Darkness, a 2005 book by Karen Armstrong

Films
 The Spiral Staircase (1946 film), an American psychological thriller film
 The Spiral Staircase (1961 film), a 1961 American film
 The Spiral Staircase (1975 film), a British remake of the 1946 film
 The Staircase (1998 film), a television film about the spiral staircase at the Loretto Chapel
 The Spiral Staircase (2000 film), a television film remake of the 1946 film

Music
 Spiral Staircase (Ralph McTell album), 1969
 Spiral Staircase – Classic Songs, a 1997 compilation album by Ralph McTell
 "Spiral Staircase", a 2003 song by Kings of Leon from Youth & Young Manhood
 Spiral Staircase (D'espairsRay DVD), 2008

See also
 Spiral Starecase, an American band
 "Spiral Stairs", nickname of Scott Kannberg
 The Circular Staircase (1908), mystery novel by Mary Roberts Rinehart